Raktokorobi  is a 2017 Indian Bengali film directed by Amitava Bhattacharya, starring Kaushik Sen, Rahul. It was included in the long list for the 90th Academy Awards. It was also released in Hollywood as Red Oleanders Raktokarobi with English subtitles.

Cast
 Kaushik Sen
 Rahul
 Ushasie Chakraborty
 Mumtaz Sorcar
 Debdut Ghosh

References

External links

2017 films
Bengali-language Indian films
2010s Bengali-language films